{{Taxobox
| name = '| image = TrichiotinusAffinis.jpg
| image_caption = Trichiotinus affinis
| image_alt =
| regnum = Animalia
| phylum = Arthropoda
| classis = Insecta
| ordo = Coleoptera
| subordo = Polyphaga
| superfamilia = Scarabaeoidea
| familia = Scarabaeidae
| subfamilia = Cetoniinae
| tribus = Trichiini
| genus = Trichiotinus}}Trichiotinus' is a genus of fruit and flower chafers in the family Scarabaeidae. There are about 8 described species in Trichiotinus, all native to the New World.

Species
 Trichiotinus affinis (Gory & Percheron, 1833)
 Trichiotinus assimilis (Kirby, 1837) (hairy flower scarab)
 Trichiotinus bibens (Fabricius, 1775)
 Trichiotinus lunulatus (Fabricius, 1775) (emerald flower scarab)
 Trichiotinus piger (Fabricius, 1775) (bee-like flower scarab)
 Trichiotinus rufobrunneus (Casey, 1914)
 Trichiotinus texanus (Horn, 1876) (Texas flower scarab)
 Trichiotinus viridans (Kirby, 1837)

References

 International Commission on Zoological Nomenclature (2006). "OPINION 2162 (Case 3314): Stegopterus Burmeister and Schaum, 1840 and Trichiotinus Casey, 1915 (Insecta, Coleoptera, Scarabaeidae): conserved". Bulletin of Zoological Nomenclature, vol. 63, part 4, 278–279.

Further reading

 NCBI Taxonomy Browser, Trichiotinus
 Arnett, R. H. Jr., M. C. Thomas, P. E. Skelley and J. H. Frank. (eds.). (21 June 2002). American Beetles, Volume II: Polyphaga: Scarabaeoidea through Curculionoidea. CRC Press LLC, Boca Raton, Florida .
 
 Richard E. White. (1983). Peterson Field Guides: Beetles''. Houghton Mifflin Company.

Cetoniinae